Nazran (Näsare) is the largest city in the Republic of Ingushetia, Russia. It served as the republic's capital in 1991–2000, until it was replaced with Magas, which was specially built for this purpose. It is the most populous city in the republic:

History

18th–20th centuries

Nazran was founded in the 18th century. After becoming a military fortress in 1817, Nazran saw large numbers of Ingush population moving into it. It was granted town status in 1967.

During the Russian Empire, the settlement was the administrative capital of the Nazranovsky Okrug of the Terek Oblast. During the Soviet period, Nazran was the administrative center of Nazranovsky District within the Chechen–Ingush Autonomous Soviet Socialist Republic. After the Republic of Ingushetia and the Chechen Republic were separated in 1991, the town became the republic's capital. This brought about a sharp increase in population: while counting 18,246 inhabitants according to the 1989 Census, during the 2002 Census Nazran had as many as 125,056 inhabitants.

21st century

2004 rebel raid on Nazran

In 2004, a force of Chechen and ethnic Ingush rebels carried out a large-scale raid on Ingushetia, led by Shamil Basayev. The overnight attacks targeted fifteen official buildings in Nazran, and at least three towns and villages located on the Baku-Rostov highway that crosses the republic from east to west.

The raid lasted nearly five hours, and the assailants - said to number 200 to 300 - withdrew almost unscathed; the raiders apparently lost only two men during the attacks. The rebels killed 67 members of security forces, including the republic's Interior Minister Abukar Kostoyev, his deputy Zyaudin Kotiev, top prosecutors, and other officials; they also captured and looted the MVD's armory and police depots. 25 civilians, including a local United Nations worker, were killed in the crossfire.

Federal Interior Minister Rashid Nurgaliyev met with General Vyacheslav Tikhomirov, the commander of Russia's Interior Ministry forces, and blamed them for the high number of deaths. Tikhomirov decided to resign after the meeting.

2008 protests
Widespread protests erupted in January 2008, with a strong government response.   The disturbances appear to have been fueled by heavy-handed government and para-military activity, including abductions, arrests and murders.  Protesters demanded the resignation of President Zyazikov.

2009 bombing

In August 2009, a suicide bomber drove a truck filled with explosives into the Nazran police headquarters. Russian news agencies reported that 25 were killed in the attack, and roughly 140 were wounded. It is believed that more bodies may still be in the rubble, yet to be found. The police headquarters was completely destroyed in the attack, including up to 30 police vehicles and munition stores.

Geography

Location

Nazran is located in the western area of Ingushetia, at the borders with Prigorodny Raion of North Ossetia-Alania. It also borders the raion of Nazranovsky; and the nearest settlements are Ekazhevo, the new town of Magas, and Barsuki. It is 27 km from the North Ossetian-Alanian capital city, Vladikavkaz, 19 from Karabulak and 54 from Malgobek.

Administrative and municipal status
Within the framework of administrative divisions, Nazran serves as the administrative center of Nazranovsky District, even though it is not a part of it. As an administrative division, it is incorporated separately as the city of republic significance of Nazran—an administrative unit with the status equal to that of the districts. As a municipal division, the city of republic significance of Nazran is incorporated as Nazran Urban Okrug.

Climate
Nazran has a humid continental climate (Köppen climate classification: Dfb).

Transportation
Nazran is located on the M29 federal highway and has a railway station on the Rostov-on-Don–Baku line. Magas Airport serves the city and the near town of Magas.

Sport
FC Angusht Nazran is the city's association football club. Its home ground is the Rashid Aushev Central Stadium.

Twin cities
 , Russia

Gallery

References

Notes

Sources

External links

 Nazran official website

 
Cities and towns in Ingushetia